Raja Imran Shah bin Raja Amin (born 21 September 1998) is a Malaysian professional footballer who plays as a centre-back for Malaysia Super League club Perak.

Club career

Sarawak United

Before the 2022 season, he signed for Sarawak United. However, he experienced unpaid payments while playing for the club. In total, he made 16 appearances, scored 2 goals and made 1 assist for Sarawak United.

Perak
On 17 November 2022, Raja Imran joined the Malaysia Super League club Perak. One of the reasons he was signed was because manager Lim Leong Kim preferred signing young Malaysian players over foreign players. After the 2023 season began, he praised the Perak fans for their passion. However, when many supporters started to question the ability of Perak managher, Lim Teong Kim, Raja Imran came to his defense.

Style of play

He is known for his height and operates as a centre-back.

Career statistics

Club

References

External links

1998 births
Living people
People from Kuala Lumpur
Malaysian footballers
Negeri Sembilan FC players
Sarawak United FC players
Perak F.C. players
Malaysia Super League players
Malaysian people of Malay descent
Association football defenders